Orost or Arast may refer to:
 Orost, Mazandaran